Jany Clair (born 2 September 1938) is a retired French actress.

Early life 
Clair was born Jany Guillaume in Lille, France.

Career 
Clair starred in a number of B-grade films in the 1950s and 1960s, in particular in a number of sword and sandal films.

Filmography 

 1957 Mademoiselle et son gang 
 1959 Legions of the Nile- Ray's elder sister.
 1960 The Night They Killed Rasputin - Irina Yousoupoff.
 1960 Lay Off Blondes - Jo
 1961 Conqueror of Maracaibo -  	Doña Isabella Valdez 
 1961 The Prisoner of the Iron Mask
 1962 79 A.D. - Myrta 
 1962 The Prisoner of the Iron Mask
 1962 Planets Against Us - Audrey Bradbury 
 1962 Kerim, Son of the Sheik 
 1963 Weapons of Vengeance
 1964 The Road to Fort Alamo - Janet.
 1964 Hercules Against the Moon Men
 1965 Mission to Caracas - Caroline.
 1965 Ces dames s'en mêlent - Casino Barmaid 
 1965 The Exterminators - Héléna Jordan

References

External links

1938 births
Living people
French film actresses
Mass media people from Lille